Shona McCallin,  (born 18 May 1992), is an English international field hockey player who plays as a midfielder for England and Great Britain. She is co-founder of thetenpercentclub, a wellness supplement company.

She was an Olympic gold medalist at the 2016 Summer Olympics.

McCallin started her career at Newark Otters and Beavers club, aged 6, coached by Christine Fergusson MBE. She then progressed through Nottinghamshire county ranks, regional and England U16, U18 and U21 squad which she captained at the Junior World Cup.

She ventured to Tilburg, Netherlands to pursue further hockey opportunities. She spent almost 4 years in the country, gaining a university degree in International Business and also becoming fluent in Dutch.

Upon return she was selected for the centralised Great Britain training programme at Bisham Abbey. She was selected for the Rio 2016 Olympic squad and helped them to win the gold medal.

Endorsements
On 22 May 2014, it was announced that McCallin had signed a multi-year agreement to represent and advise on products for American field hockey manufacturer STX.

References

External links
 
http://www.shonamccallin.com
https://www.teamgb.com/athlete/shona-mccallin/54Uns3OBPTYNXeyF6NNnCM

Living people
1992 births
People educated at Repton School
People educated at Kesteven and Grantham Girls' School
English female field hockey players
Field hockey players at the 2016 Summer Olympics
Field hockey players at the 2020 Summer Olympics
Olympic field hockey players of Great Britain
British female field hockey players
Medalists at the 2016 Summer Olympics
Olympic gold medallists for Great Britain
Olympic medalists in field hockey
Members of the Order of the British Empire
Sportspeople from Derby
Olympic bronze medallists for Great Britain
Medalists at the 2020 Summer Olympics
Field hockey players at the 2022 Commonwealth Games
Commonwealth Games gold medallists for England
Commonwealth Games medallists in field hockey
Medallists at the 2022 Commonwealth Games